North Chungcheong Province (Chungcheongbuk-do), also known as Chungbuk, is a province of South Korea. North Chungcheong has a population of 1,578,934 (2014) and has a geographic area of  located in the Hoseo region in the south-center of the Korean Peninsula. North Chungcheong borders the provinces of Gyeonggi and Gangwon to the north, North Gyeongsang to the east, North Jeolla to the south and South Chungcheong, Sejong Special Autonomous City and Daejeon Metropolitan City to the west.

Cheongju is the capital and largest city of North Chungcheong, with other major cities including Chungju and Jecheon.

North Chungcheong was established in 1896 from the province of Chungcheong, one of the Eight Provinces of Korea, consisting of the northeastern half of the territory, and is South Korea's only landlocked province. North Chungcheong was known as Chūsei-hoku Prefecture during the Japanese Colonial Period from 1910 and became part of South Korea following the division of Korea in 1945.

Geography
The province is part of the Hoseo region, and is bounded on the west by Chungcheongnam-do province, on the north by Gyeonggi-do and Gangwon-do provinces, on the south by Jeollabuk-do province, and on the east by Gyeongsangbuk-do. Chungcheongbuk-do is the only land-locked province in South Korea. The province is mostly mountainous, dominated by the Noryeong Mountains to the north and the Sobaek Mountains to the east.

Demographics

Resources
Agricultural products includes rice, barley, beans, and potatoes, but the province specializes in ginseng and tobacco. The tobacco was introduced from the US in 1912, transplanted from Virginia.

There are mineral reserves of gold, iron, coal, steatite, fluorite, and molybdenum, as well as marble and limestone in the northern part of the province. Silk weaving plays an important role.

Attractions
The main attractions in the province are Mount Songni in the Sobaek mountains and its national park. Beopjusa, the site of one of the oldest temples of Korea is located in this national park, as is Guinsa, the headquarters of the Cheontae sect. There is another national park around Mount Worak.

Administrative divisions

Chungcheongbuk-do is divided into 3 cities (si) and 8 counties (gun). Each entity is listed below in English, Hangul, and Hanja.

Religion

According to the 2015 census, 16.3% of the population follows Buddhism and 23.1% follow Christianity (15.8% Protestantism and 7.3% Catholicism). 59.9% of the population is not religious and 0.7% of the population follows other religions.

Education
Chungcheongbuk-do is the site of several tertiary institutions, including:

Chungbuk National University
Korea National University of Transportation (formerly Chungju National University)
Korea Air Force Academy
Korea National University of Education
Cheongju National University of Education
Cheongju University
Seowon University
Semyung University
Far East University
Youngdong University
Chung Cheong College
Jusung College
Daewon Science College
Konkuk University
Gangdong College

References

External links

  

 
Provinces of South Korea